Vitalina Koval is an LGBTI human rights defender in Ukraine. She campaigns for women rights and LGBTI rights. She is from Uzhgorod.

ACTIVISM 
Vitalina Koval organised social events for LGBTI people but these were largely secret. She then set up a community centre for LGBTI people in Uzhgorod. The centre offered peer to peer support to LGBTI people.

Koval campaigns for the protection of minorities from hate crimes. She organised International Women's Day rallies in 2017 and in 2018. Karpatska Sich, a radical group attacked the rally in 2018. Vitalina Koval sustained an eye injury after being doused with paint. She reported this attack to the police. Two people are being prosecuted for this attack but the investigation to qualify the attack as a hate crime is ongoing.

Koval and members of her group have received threats from far-right groups.

Hate crimes 
Amnesty International Ukraine has criticised the Ukrainian authorities for failing to investigate attacks against activists in particular those defending the rights of women and members of the lesbian, gay, bisexual, and transgender community, and ethnic minorities. In 2018, Koval's case was featured in Amnesty International's Write for Rights campaign.

International Human rights advocacy 
Koval attended the Human Rights Summit in Paris. She also met EU high representative Federica Mogherini at the Gymnich meeting of EU foreign ministers in Helsinki in August 2019.

References

Ukrainian LGBT rights activists
People from Uzhhorod
Ukrainian women's rights activists
Year of birth missing (living people)
Living people